Jan Sarkander (Czech and Polish: Jan Sarkander) (20 December 1576 – 17 March 1620) was a Polish-Czech Roman Catholic priest. Sarkander was married for a short period of time before he became widowed and pursued a path to the priesthood where he became active in defence of the faith during a period of anti-Catholic sentiment and conflict. He himself was arrested on false accusations as a means of silencing him and he refused to give in to his tormenters who tortured him for around a month before he died.

Pope Pius IX beatified Sarkander at Saint Peter's Basilica in 1860 and Pope John Paul II canonized him as a saint in 1995 on his visit to the Czech Republic.

Life
Jan Sarkander was born on 20 December 1576 in Skoczów, Bohemia (now in Poland) into a Silesian household as the son of Georg Mathias Sarkander and Helene Górecka. He had one sister and three other brothers: Nicholas (a priest himself), Paul, and Wenceslas. His father died in 1589 and so his family moved to Příbor. His mother remarried and gave birth to his half-brother Matthew. Sarkander intended to become a priest but dropped the idea and instead married. He and his wife then settled in Brno. The marriage was short-lived for his wife died one year later. There were no children. He then took up studies for the priesthood, convinced that God was calling him.

Sarkander studied at the Olomouc college from 1597 until 1600 due to the plague which forced him to transfer to the Charles University in Prague. He obtained his degree of master of philosophy at Prague in 1603. He continued theological studies in Austria from 1604. He later underwent theological studies at the University of Graz and passed his examinations on 21 December 1607. He was made a sub-deacon on 20 December 1608 and elevated into the diaconate on 16 March 1609.

On 22 December 1607, he received the minor orders from Cardinal Franz von Dietrichstein. The Bishop of Olomouc Jan Křtitel Civalli ordained him to the priesthood on 22 March 1609 in Graz. Sarkander was assigned to work as a parish priest in Boskowitz and then sent to Holešov in 1616. Baron von Lobkowitz from Moravia supported Sarkander's efforts in the region but the rich anti-Catholic landowner Bitowsky von Bistritz opposed him to the extent that he wanted Sarkander killed. The Thirty Years War began in 1618 and it saw a bitter conflict between the Protestants and Catholics and this forced him to flee to Poland on 17 May 1619 for a brief period of time when the Protestants occupied Holleschau. He made a pilgrimage to the Shrine of Our Lady of Czestochowa, and passed a few weeks of retreat with the Minims, who had a house there. He also spent a few months in Cracow. Then he returned home.

In February 1620 Polish auxiliary troops sent to the emperor by King Sigismund, passed through Moravia and committed many depredations on the lands of the Protestants, but spared Holleschau when John met them with the Blessed sacrament in his hands. The Jesuits helped him to reconcile 200 non-Catholics to the faith but other non-Catholics were severely angered by this.

During the ongoing Bohemian Revolt—Protestant Moravian Estates (under von Bistritz) accused Sarkander of collaborating with Baron von Lobkowitz to bring the enemy into the territory. He was taken prisoner and brought to Olmütz where he was tortured. Sarkander was interrogated regarding who had called the troops into the country; what dealings had he in Poland, and with whom; and what had Lobkowitz confided to him in confession. He refused to divulge what was said under the seal of confession under which priests are bound. The rack was used on him on 13 February and again on the 17th and 18th for up to three hours. Lit candles were applied to him and feathers soaked in oil, pitch, and sulphur strewn over his body and ignited. He lingered from the effects for a month and died in prison on March 17, 1620.

Veneration

The beatification process opened under Pope Benedict XIV, but the process was interrupted and thus remained inactive following this. Pope Pius IX approved the fact that Sarkander was killed in odium fidei ("in hatred of the faith") on 11 September 1859 and beatified him as a result on 6 May 1860. He is acknowledged as a martyr. Pope John Paul II approved a miracle due to the intercession of Sarkander on 2 April 1993 and canonized him on the occasion of his visit to the Czech Republic on 21 May 1995.

Jan Sarkander's relics lie in Saint Wenceslas Cathedral in Olomouc (Czech Republic).

A chapel dedicated to him stands at the top of Michael's Hill on the former site of the prison. The original torturing rack and Sarkander's gravestone are preserved here.

References

1576 births
1620 deaths
People from Cieszyn County
Czech Roman Catholic saints
Polish Roman Catholic saints
People from Cieszyn Silesia
Polish torture victims
17th-century Roman Catholic martyrs
Palacký University Olomouc alumni
Charles University alumni
University of Graz alumni